= William Hall Gilby =

English geologist

- Occupation: Geologist

William Hall Gilby (died 1821?) was an English geologist.

== Biography ==
Gilby was the son of William Gilby, M.D., an English physician. He studied under Professor Jameson at Edinburgh, where he graduated M.D. in 1815, his thesis being ‘Disceptatio … de mutationibus quas ea, quæ e terra gignuntur, aëri inferent,’ Edinb. 1815, 8vo, pp. 26, at which time he was annual president of the Royal Society of Medicine in that city. He wrote several papers, chiefly on geological subjects, his last being on the respiration of plants in the ‘Edinburgh Philosophical Journal’ for 1821. The date of his death has not been ascertained, but, as he was a frequent essayist until that year, he probably died either then or very shortly after. He was a member of the Geological Society before its incorporation.
